Simon Acheampong Tampi is a Ghanaian politician and member of the Seventh Parliament of the Fourth Republic of Ghana representing the Tatale-Sanguli Constituency in the Northern Region on the ticket of the National Democratic Congress. He was born in April 24, 1975.

Between 1996 and 2002, Simon was a surveyor at Nulux Plantation Limited and also a teacher at Nakpalu-Borle  Primary School between 2005 and 2016. 

He has advanced B.S. certificate from Sunyani Polytechnic, a certificate in vocational and technical education from the University of Education Winneba and a B.S certificate in Construction Education.

References

Ghanaian MPs 2017–2021
1975 births
Living people
National Democratic Congress (Ghana) politicians
Sunyani Technical University alumni